Florent Lucien Serra (born 28 February 1981) is a French retired professional tennis player. A right-hander, he won two ATP titles during his career and achieved a career-high singles ranking of World No. 36 in June 2006.

Career

Early life and junior career

Serra was born in Bordeaux, in the southwest of France, in 1981 to Jean-Luc and Martine. He started playing tennis at the age of seven at a tennis club in Bordeaux after his father got him involved. After completing his A-level equivalent (the French "bac") with a major in economics at 18, Serra left Bordeaux for Paris, to train under the national training program at Roland Garros. As a result of playing minimal junior tournaments, his career high junior ranking was no. 437 on 31 December 1999. He turned pro in 2000.

Professional career

From 2000 to 2002, he reached six Futures finals, winning one of them, along with reaching his first Challenger final. He made his debut on the ATP Tour in 2003. In 2005 he had his most successful year, winning three out of four Challenger finals, and his first ATP tour title, in Bucharest. He won his second title the following year in Adelaide.
In 2009, he was a runner-up in Casablanca. He has been coached by Pierre Cherret since he was a junior player, and his fitness trainer is Paul Quetin.
Serra reached the 2nd round of Wimbledon 2012, losing to Kei Nishikori, 3–6, 5–7, 2–6.

Personal

His mother works as a secretary in Bordeaux, while Serra himself lives in Neuchâtel, Switzerland.

ATP career finals

Singles: 3 (2 titles, 1 runner-up)

Doubles: 1 (1 runner-up)

ATP Challenger and ITF Futures finals

Singles: 13 (4–9)

Doubles: 3 (1–2)

Performance timelines

Singles

Doubles

References

External links 

 
 Serra Recent Match Results
 Serra World Ranking History

1981 births
Living people
French male tennis players
French expatriate sportspeople in Switzerland
Tennis players from Bordeaux